Miljko is a Serbian masculine given name, derived from Slavic mil- ("love, to like") and hypocoristic suffix -ko, both very common in Slavic dithematic names. It may refer to:

Miljko Radonjić (1770–1836), Serbian writer, professor and minister
Miljko Radisavljević, Special prosecutor for organized crime
Miljko Radonjić, drummer, Riblja Čorba
Miljko's Monastery, Serbia
Miljko Živojinović, movie producer, Shadows of Memories
Miljko Stefanović, Serbian officer, 252nd Training Squadron

See also
Milko (disambiguation)
Miljković

Slavic given names
Serbian masculine given names